For the Girl Who Has Everything may refer to:

 "For the Girl Who Has Everything" (song), a song by 'N Sync
 "For the Girl Who Has Everything" (Randall and Hopkirk (Deceased))
 "For the Girl Who Has Everything" (Supergirl), an episode of the television series Supergirl